Lismacrory Mounds are a group of prehistoric mounds forming a National Monument in County Tipperary, Ireland. They are 2.2 km (1.4 mi) north of Ballingarry, North Tipperary, 10 km (6.3 mi) southeast of Lough Derg.

There are about 20 mounds, or cairns, in the area. They were originally assumed to be burial sites, but are now thought to be piles of stones discarded from fulachtaí fia. Other structures identified in the area include ringforts, dwellings and enclosure sites.

References

Archaeological sites in County Tipperary
National Monuments in County Tipperary